Stefan Janković (born 20 August 1992) is a Bosnian handball player who plays for RK Sloga Doboj and the Bosnian national team.

References

1992 births
Living people
Bosnia and Herzegovina male handball players
Sportspeople from Banja Luka
RK Borac Banja Luka players
Serbs of Bosnia and Herzegovina